The Living and the Dead is Jolie Holland's fourth studio album. It was released on October 7, 2008, through Anti Records. The album was mixed and engineered by Joel Hamilton.

Track listing 
 "Mexico City"
 "Corrido Por Buddy" 
 "Palmyra" 
 "You Painted Yourself In"
 "Fox In its Hole"
 "Your Big Hands"
 "Sweet Loving Man"
 "Love Henry"
 "The Future"
 "Enjoy Yourself"

Personnel 
 Jolie Holland – vocals, guitar, drum, fiddle, clapping, whistling, producer
 M Ward – guitar, bass, producer
 Shahzad Ismaily – bass, percussion, electric guitar, moog, shruthi box, robots, duck call, producer
 Marc Ribot – guitar
 Samantha Parton – harmonies
 Garth Steel Klippert - trumpet
 Colin Stetson - cornet
 Marc Alan Goodman - clapping
 Marika Hughes - cello
 Kenny Wolleson - drums
 Joel Hamilton - guitar
 Rachel Blumberg - drums
 Jim White - drums
 Samantha Parton - vocals
 Jenni Quilter - dishes

References

External links 
 http://www.anti.com/news/index/516/JOLIE_HOLLAND_TO_RELEASE_THE_LIVING_AND_THE_DEAD_OCTOBER_7TH

2008 albums
Jolie Holland albums